Katherine Dienes also known as Katherine Dienes-Williams (born in Wellington, 10 January 1970) is a New Zealand-born organist, conductor and composer. She is currently Organist and Master of the Choristers at Guildford Cathedral and is the first woman to hold the most senior musical post in a Church of England cathedral. Her husband is Patrick Williams, librarian of the Royal Philharmonic Orchestra, and they have a daughter, Hannah, who sang as a chorister at Guildford Cathedral .

Early career and education
Dienes was born and educated in Wellington, New Zealand, and studied for a BA in Modern Languages and a BMus at Victoria University, Wellington. She was organ scholar at Saint Paul's Cathedral, Wellington from 1988 to 1991 when she was appointed Assistant Organist there. She also acted as Assistant Conductor of the Wellington Youth Choir and appeared as a soloist with Wellington Youth Orchestra.

Dienes came to England in 1991 to take up the post of organ scholar at Winchester Cathedral and Assistant Organist at Winchester College.

Appointments

Collegiate Church of St Mary, Warwick
Dienes was appointed Director of Music St Mary's, Warwick, in 2001 where she directed and trained the choir of gentlemen and boys, the girls' choir, and Collegium, an adult concert choir based at the church. With the choirs of St Mary's she made a recording of Advent and Christmas music, A Spotless Rose, on Regent Records (REG CD 236).

Guildford Cathedral
In September 2007, Dienes was appointed Organist and Master of the Choristers at Guildford Cathedral. She assumed the post in January 2008, taking over from Stephen Farr and becoming the first woman to hold the senior music post at a Church of England cathedral.

Compositions
Dienes has composed a number of sacred works, mainly for upper voices, as well as some secular compositions. She was commissioned to write a Mass setting commissioned by Norwich Cathedral.

Treble Clef Music Press published her music as follows:
 Adam Lay I-bounden
 Ave Maria
 Ave Verum
 Father Julius Canticles (Magnificat, Nunc Dimittis)
 Magnificat "Regina coeli" with antiphon for Easter season
 Silent Night (setting for choir and organ)

Discography
 A Spotless Rose, Advent to Epiphany at St Mary's, Warwick, with the choirs of St Mary's, Warwick, for Regent Records, REGCD236

Critical reception

The Washington Post, reviewing Songs for Hannah, noted "Joy and glee, of course, can be subjective. The Hannah texts are pretty severe: There's a lot of 'the wicked shall be put to silence in darkness' and 'they that strive with the Lord shall be broken in pieces.' But [Dienes-Williams's] music was luminous, with insistent rhythms and an almost ancient, incantatory feel."

John W. Lambert, reviewing the Guildford Cathedral Choir's visit to Raleigh, NC during its US East Coast tour, observed that Dienes-Williams "has a huge and altogether favorable reputation among church musicians." He went on to say that the reputation was "richly deserved"; she was a "highly animated director, and she elicited some of the most remarkable 'church choir' singing heard hereabouts in a long time." A Haydn motet "left many members of the audience awe-struck."

References

External links
 Guildford Cathedral: Katherine Dienes-Williams

1970 births
Cathedral organists
English classical organists
Women organists
Living people
New Zealand expatriates in the United Kingdom
Victoria University of Wellington alumni
21st-century English women musicians
21st-century organists